Serguei Vladilenovich Krasnikov (1961) is a Russian physicist.

Life
Krasnikov obtained a doctorate (CSc.) in physics and mathematics from Saint Petersburg University. He is currently based at Pulkovo Observatory in St. Petersburg, Russia.

Krasnikov’s work is focused on theoretical physics, specifically on the development of the Krasnikov tube and its applications in causality, closed timelike curves, and hyperfast travel.

In 2001, Krasnikov worked at Starlab, in a joint NASA/USAF-funded project to assess the viability of time travel under realistic physical conditions.

In 2002 he attended the 11th UK Conference on the Foundations of Physics hosted by the Faculty of Philosophy, University of Oxford at which he delivered the paper "Time machine (1988-2001)".

See also 
 Alcubierre drive
 Wormhole

References

External links
 Homepage  at the Alexander Friedmann Laboratory for Theoretical Physics
 Curriculum Vitae at the Friedmann Laboratory website
 TEDxBrussels 2009 Serguei Krasnikov on time travel

1961 births
Living people
Russian physicists
Quantum physicists
Time travel